Thinksound (stylized as thinksound) is an independent manufacturer of headphones and audio equipment based in Toronto, Ontario. The company manufactured wooden earphones which it claims are more environmentally friendly and sound better than earphones made from plastic and metal.

History
Thinksound was founded in 2009 by Aaron Fournier and Mike Tunney.

References

External links
Official Website 
Stereophile Review
CNET ts02 Review
CNET ms01 Review

Headphones manufacturers
Companies based in New Hampshire
Audio equipment manufacturers of the United States